Norman Frederick Magee (September 22, 1922 – September 8, 1985) was a politician from Alberta, Canada. He served in the Legislative Assembly of Alberta from 1979 to 1982 as a member of the governing Progressive Conservative caucus.

Political career
Magee ran for a seat to the Alberta Legislature in the 1979 general election, in the electoral district of Red Deer.  He defeated Social Credit candidate and future member of Parliament Bob Mills and two other candidates.

References

External links
Legislative Assembly of Alberta Members Listing

1922 births
1985 deaths
Politicians from Toronto
Progressive Conservative Association of Alberta MLAs